Rawalpindi War Cemetery is a cemetery situated on Harley Street in Rawalpindi in Punjab, Pakistan.

It is situated in the cantonment area. It is part of the Protestant Cemetery known as Gora Qabrastan (The Foreign Cemetery). It is maintained by the Commonwealth War Graves Commission.

The cemetery contains 257 Commonwealth burials of the First World War, connected mainly with the operations on the North-West Frontier. There are also 101 burials from the Second World War.

See also 
 Karachi War Cemetery

References 

Cemeteries in Punjab, Pakistan
Commonwealth War Graves Commission cemeteries in Pakistan